Ahmedin Muktar Jemal is an American cancer epidemiologist who serves as senior vice president of the Surveillance & Health Equity Science Department of the American Cancer Society. He has been researching racial differences in lung cancer rates since the mid-1990s, when he was a fellow at the National Cancer Institute.

References

External links
Faculty page

Living people
American epidemiologists
Cancer epidemiologists
American Cancer Society people
Addis Ababa University alumni
Louisiana State University alumni
Year of birth missing (living people)